Lobos de Tlaxcala is a football team that plays in the Tercera División de México out of group 3. The club was established after the franchise was moved from Oaxaca in 2009.

History
The club was founded in 1973, formed mostly by the young players of the state of Tlaxcala joining the Tercera División de México. They were giving the nickname Lobos (Wolves) and also Escuadrón Verde (Green Brigade) because of their green home jersey. By 1978–79 the club would reach the final and earn a promotion to the Segunda División de México. The club played in the Segunda División de México from 1979–1982 after relegation back to the Tercera División de México. The club would go on hiatus, returning in 2003 under the name Guerreros de Tlaxcala.

In 2009 Alejandro Escudero took over the club, joining an amateur football league liga dominical de futsal under the name PIDE B.In 2011 the club joined the Tercera División de México after winning the liga dominical de futsal in 2008, 2009 and 2010.

Honors
Tercera División de México (1) 1978–79
liga dominical de futsal serie A (2):2009, 2010
dominical de futsal serie B (1:)2008
torneo de copa :(2) 2009, 2010

Footnotes

Football clubs in Mexico
Association football clubs established in 1973
1973 establishments in Mexico